Bottesford South railway station was a railway station serving the village of Bottesford, Leicestershire, on the Great Northern and London and North Western Joint Railway. It opened in 1879 and was served by LNWR trains running between Northampton and Newark and Great Northern Railway trains running between Melton Mowbray and Grantham. The station closed when the Northampton to Newark through service was withdrawn and replaced by an infrequent connecting service in 1882.

References

Disused railway stations in Nottinghamshire
Railway stations in Great Britain opened in 1879
Railway stations in Great Britain closed in 1882
Former Great Northern Railway stations
Former London and North Western Railway stations